The Effretikon to Hinwil railway line, also known as the Kempttalbahn, is a railway line in the Swiss canton of Zurich. It runs from Effretikon, where it diverges from the Zurich to Winterthur line, to Wetzikon, where it connects with the Wallisellen to Rapperswil line, and Hinwil.

The Effretikon to Hinwil line was constructed between 1873 and 1876 by the Eisenbahngesellschaft Effretikon–Pfäffikon–Hinwil, but was operated from the beginning by the Swiss Northeastern Railway (NOB). The line passed to the Swiss Federal Railways in 1902, and was electrified in 1944.

The Effretikon to Hinwil line is served by passenger services of the Zurich S-Bahn, although no single route runs throughout the line. Route S3 operates from Zurich via Effretikon to Wetzikon, where it terminates. Route S14 operates from Zurich to Wetzikon, using the alternative and faster route from Wallisellen, but then continues on this line to terminate at Hinwil.

At Hinwil, the Effretikon to Hinwil line makes a junction with the former Uerikon to Bauma railway (UeBB). The Uerikon to Hinwil section of this line was closed in 1948 and little now remains. But in the other direction, to Bauma, the Dampfbahn-Verein Zürcher Oberland (DVZO) operates heritage railway services, with trains normally hauled by steam locomotives.

Notes

References

External links
 

Railway lines in Switzerland
Railway lines opened in 1876
1876 establishments in Switzerland
Swiss Federal Railways lines
15 kV AC railway electrification